Patrick Nair (15 August 1932 – 7 October 2017) was a Roman Catholic bishop.

Ordained to the priesthood in 1959, Nair served as bishop of the Roman Catholic Diocese of Meerut, India, from 1974 to 2008.

See also
Catholic Church in India

References

1932 births
2017 deaths
20th-century Roman Catholic bishops in India
People from Agra